NGC 6284 is a globular cluster located in the constellation Ophiuchus. It is designated as IX in the galaxy morphological classification scheme and was discovered by the German-born British astronomer William Herschel on 22 May 1784. It is at a distance of 49,900 light years away from Earth.

The nearby metal-poor star  may be a recent runaway from NGC 6284.

See also 
 List of NGC objects (6001–7000)
 List of NGC objects

References

External links 
 

Globular clusters
6284
Ophiuchus (constellation)